Juan Pablo Pérez Alfonzo (13 December 1903 – 3 September 1979), was a prominent Venezuelan diplomat, politician and lawyer primarily responsible for the inception and creation of OPEC, along with Saudi Arabian minister Abdullah Tariki.

Early life and education 
Born in Caracas, Venezuela, Pérez Alfonzo was initially a medical student before pursuing a PhD in political and social sciences at the Central University of Venezuela.

Political career

Gallegos administration and subsequent exile 
Pérez Alfonzo helped found the political party Democratic Action (AD; Acción Democrática). As Minister of Development during the first democratic government of Venezuela, the short-lived administration of Rómulo Gallegos (1947–1948), he was responsible for increasing oil revenues for the country by raising taxes through what later became known worldwide as the 50/50 formula. Initially, the Seven Sisters (the dominant Anglo-American oil companies), responded to the 50/50 law by threatening to ramp up production elsewhere while slowing down production in Venezuela. Perez Alfonso subsequently encouraged other governments to adopt the 50/50 formula, which they ultimately did. The 50/50 formula was the global norm until 1970.

With the overthrow of the democratically elected government of President Rómulo Gallegos by the military in November 1948, Perez Alfonzo obtained political asylum in the United States after spending 9 months in jail.  He moved to Mexico for financial reasons, where he resided until the return of democracy in 1958, when the democratically elected President Rómulo Betancourt called him back to government service to finish the job he had begun under the presidency of Gallegos, this time as Minister of Energy.  During the years he spent in Washington he studied the activities of the oil industry worldwide and, in particular, the Texas Railroad Commission (TRC), which served to reinforce his ideas about creating OPEC, further developing his thoughts about conservation and stabilization of petroleum production and the defense of oil prices.

Betancourt administration and OPEC creation 
As Minister of Mines and Hydrocarbons during the second democratic government of Venezuela of president Rómulo Betancourt (1959–1964), he was responsible for the creation of OPEC (Organization of Petroleum Exporting Countries) for the purpose of rationalizing and thereby increasing oil prices in the world market. Triggered by a 1960 law instituted by US President Dwight Eisenhower that forced quotas for Venezuelan oil and favored Canada and Mexico's oil industries, Perez Alfonzo (also known as the Father of OPEC) reacted seeking an alliance with oil producing Arab nations to protect the continuous autonomy and profitability of Venezuela's oil (among other reasons), establishing a strong link between the South American nation and the Middle East region that survives to this day. His extensive notes of the TRC methods for regulation of production to maximize recovery served him well both in Venezuela and later when he took them translated into Arabic to the Cairo meeting that served as launching platform for OPEC, where Wanda Jablonski introduced him to then minister of petroleum of Saudi Arabia, Abdullah Tariki, co-founder of OPEC.

Personal life
He was an ascetic vegetarian.

Legacy and death

After the 1973 oil crisis, the brief period of economic prosperity for Venezuela was relatively short lived. In 1976 Pérez Alfonzo gave an intuitive warning about what economists now call the "natural resource curse": "Ten years from now, twenty years from now, you will see, oil will bring us ruin... It is the devil's excrement." This was the case during the "1980s oil glut". OPEC member countries were not adhering strictly to their assigned quotas, and once again oil prices plummeted.

Pérez Alfonzo died in Washington, D.C., at the Georgetown University Hospital on 3 September 1979, having succumbed to pancreatic cancer. He was 75 years old.

El Vigía's Juan Pablo Pérez Alfonzo Airport was named in his honor in 1991.

Since 1998, the Orden Juan Pablo Pérez Alfonzo (Order of Juan Pablo Pérez Alfonzo) is the Venezuelan award of state given to those who contribute to works related to mining, petroleum and energy.

Books
 Petróleo: jugo de la tierra. Caracas: Editorial Arte, 1961.
 La Dinámica del petróleo en el progreso de Venezuela. Caracas: Central University of Venezuela, 1965.
 Petróleo de vida o muerte (debate with Arturo Uslar Pietri). Caracas: Editorial Arte, 1966. 
 El pentágono petrolero: la política nacionalista de defensa y conservación del petroleo. Caracas: Revista Política, 1967.
 ¿Hasta cuándo los abusos de La Electricidad?: informe sobre el caso Guarenas. Guarenas: Municipal Council, 1969.
 Petróleo y dependencia. Caracas: Síntesis Dos Mil, 1971. 
 Hundiéndonos en el excremento del diablo. Caracas: Editorial Lisbona, 1976.
 El desastre (with Domingo Alberto Rangel and Pedro Duno). Valencia: Vadell Hermanos, 1976. 
 Alternativas (with Iván Loscher). Caracas: Garbizu & Todtmann Editores, 1976.
 Venezuela y el petróleo. Caracas: Centro Gumilla, 1976.

Notes

References

  Fundación Polar (1997), Diccionario de Historia de Venezuela, Caracas, Venezuela

1903 births
1979 deaths
People from Caracas
Venezuelan diplomats
Oil ministers
OPEC people
Democratic Action (Venezuela) politicians
Government ministers of Venezuela
20th-century Venezuelan lawyers
Academic staff of the Central University of Venezuela
Central University of Venezuela alumni
Venezuelan political scientists
20th-century political scientists
Planning ministers of Venezuela